Willard Pearson (July 4, 1915 – March 6, 1996) was a United States Army Lieutenant General who served as commander of the 1st Brigade, 101st Airborne Division  during the Vietnam War and later as commander of V Corps.

Early life and education

Pearson was born on July 4, 1915 and he was a native of West Elizabeth, Pennsylvania. Pearson was a graduate of George Washington University.

Military service

Vietnam War
In January 1966 BG Pearson took command of the 1st Brigade, 101st Airborne Division. During his time in command of the 1st Brigade he advocated the use of semi-guerilla tactics of night operations and long range reconnaissance patrols, which were adopted by his subordinate Maj. David Hackworth who established Tiger Force. These tactics involved "to probe as far into enemy territory as possible, make contact, then reinforce by helicopter." Pearson was described as being "regarded with a mixture of respect and astonishment."

Post Vietnam
He served as commander of V Corps from 14 February 1971 to 31 May 1973 when he retired from the Army.

Later life
He served as superintendent of the Valley Forge Military Academy and College from 1973 to 1985.

Personal life

Pearson was married to Reba E Barton until his death.
1973 Pearson was bestowed with the Commander's cross of the Order of Merit of the Federal Republic of Germany.

References

1915 births
1996 deaths
People from West Elizabeth, Pennsylvania
United States Army generals
Recipients of the Silver Star
Military personnel from Pennsylvania